Foster Whaley (March 23, 1920 – April 25, 1993) was an American politician who served in the Texas House of Representatives from 1979 to 1989.

References

1920 births
1993 deaths
Democratic Party members of the Texas House of Representatives
20th-century American politicians